Cucurbita moschata is a species originating in either Central America or northern South America. It includes cultivars known as squash or pumpkin. C. moschata cultivars are generally more tolerant of hot, humid weather than cultivars of C. maxima or C. pepo. They also generally display a greater resistance to disease and insects, especially to the squash vine borer. Commercially made pumpkin pie mix is most often made from varieties of C. moschata. The ancestral species of the genus Cucurbita were present in the Americas before the arrival of humans. Evolutionarily speaking the genus is relatively recent in origin as no species within the genus is genetically isolated from all the other species. C. moschata acts as the genetic bridge within the genus and is closest to the genus' progenitor.

All species of squashes and pumpkins are native to the Western Hemisphere.  C. moschata, represented by such varieties as Cushaw and Winter Crookneck Squashes, and Japanese Pie and Large Cheese Pumpkins, is a long-vining plant native to Mexico and Central America. This species and C. pepo apparently originated in the same general area, Mexico and Central America. Both are important food plants of the original people of the region, ranking next to maize and beans. The flowers and the mature seeds, and the flesh of the fruit are eaten in some areas.

Before the arrival of Europeans, C. moschata and C. pepo had been carried over all parts of North America where they could be grown. Still, they had not been carried into South America as had beans, which originated in the same general region. They were generally grown by indigenous people all over what is now the United States. Many of these peoples, particularly in the west, still grow a diversity of hardy squashes and pumpkins not to be found in commercial markets.

Varieties
Cultivars include:

 Al Hachi – a winter squash used in Kashmir, usually dried
 Aehobak – a summer squash, also called Korean zucchini
 Brazilian crook neck, Abóbora de pescoço or Abóbora seca – a large, curved-neck variety with deep orange flesh and dark green skin with light orange highlights found in Brazil.
 Butternut squash – a popular winter squash in much of North America
 Calabaza – a commonly grown winter squash in the Caribbean, tropical America, and the Philippines
 Dickinson pumpkin – Libby's uses a proprietary strain of Dickinson for its canned pumpkin
 Giromon – a large, green cultivar, grown primarily in the Caribbean. Haitians use it to make the traditional "soupe giromon".
 Golden Cushaw – Similar in shape but a different species than the common Cucurbita argyrosperma "cushaw" type.
 Loche – a landrace of squashes from Peru.
 Liscia – grows early in the season, reaching maturation after 115 to 130 days
 Long Island cheese pumpkin – the exterior resembles a wheel of cheese in shape, color, and texture
 Musquée de Provence, Moscata di Provenza or Fairytale pumpkin – a large hybrid from France with sweet, fragrant, deep-orange flesh often sold by the slice due to its size. 
 Naples long squash or Courge pleine de Naples – a large, long squash with deep green skin and small bulb at the end. It is 10 to 25 kg on average and found in France and Italy
 São Paulo pumpkin or Abóbora paulista is a butternut-shaped variety with well-defined white and green stripes along its length
 Seminole pumpkin – an heirloom variety originally cultivated by the Seminole people of what is now Florida
 Tromboncino – a summer squash, also known as "Zucchetta"

Gallery

References

External links

moschata
Squashes and pumpkins